The Cantharoid beetles are a deprecated non-monophyletic taxonomic grouping (formerly superfamily Cantharoidea), whose former members are now mostly within the currently accepted superfamily Elateroidea, and some (the former families Drilidae and Omalisidae) are now within Elateridae. One former family, Cneoglossidae, is now in the superfamily Byrrhoidea.

Families 
 Lampyridae – firefly beetles
 Rhagophthalmidae – Asian starworms
 Phengodidae LeConte 1861 – glowworm beetles
 Brachypsectridae Leconte & Horn, 1883 – Texas beetles
 Lycidae – net-winged beetles
 Omethidae LeConte, 1861 – false firefly beetles  (including Telegeusidae)
 Cantharidae – soldier beetles (including Chauliognathidae)

References

External links 

 
Obsolete arthropod taxa
Insect common names